John Birmingham (born 7 August 1964) is a British-born Australian author, known for the 1994 memoir He Died with a Felafel in His Hand, and his Axis of Time trilogy.

Early life and education

Birmingham was born in Liverpool, United Kingdom, but grew up in Ipswich, Queensland, Australia, having moved to the country with his parents in 1970. Birmingham received his higher education at Saint Edmund's College in Ipswich and at the University of Queensland in Brisbane. Birmingham's only stint of full-time employment was as a researcher at the Australian Department of Defence but he has worked for the television program A Current Affair.

Career
Birmingham returned to Queensland to study law but he did not complete his legal studies, choosing instead to pursue a career as an author. Birmingham has a degree in international relations and currently lives in Brisbane.

Writing
Birmingham was first published in Semper Floreat, the student newspaper at the University of Queensland in Brisbane, writing a series of stories featuring a fictional character named Commander Harrison Biscuit. His first paid published work appeared in a student magazine at the University of Queensland. He won a young writers award for the Independent, which was edited by Brian Toohey and wrote a number of articles for Rolling Stone and Australian Penthouse magazines.

In 1994 Birmingham released his sharehouse living memoir He Died with a Felafel in His Hand, which has since been turned into a play, film and a graphic novel. The sequel is The Tasmanian Babes Fiasco (Duffy and Snellgrove, 1997), the theatrical version of which was written and produced by 36 unemployed actors. In 2011 it was the longest running stage play in Australian history. In 2014, three Brisbane filmmakers sought funds to make a film version via crowdfunding.

His other works include The Search for Savage Henry, a crime novel featuring the character Harrison Biscuit, How To Be A Man, a semi-humorous guide to contemporary Australian masculinity and Off One's Tits, a collection of essays and articles previously published elsewhere. He also spent four years researching the history of Sydney for Leviathan: the unauthorised biography of Sydney (Random House, 1999). It won Australia's National Prize For Non-Fiction in 2002. In 2010, the Sydney Theatre Company created a play based upon the non-fiction book Leviathan that focus on the dark side of the evolution of the city of Sydney.

He has also written two small pocket books The Felafel Guide to Getting Wasted (2002) and The Felafel Guide to Sex (2002) which feature advice Birmingham has received over the years regarding those two subjects. He also wrote the nonfiction book "Dopeland" which examined Australia's cannabis culture.

Birmingham has written two Quarterly Essays (Black Inc. an imprint of Schwartz Publishing Pty Ltd) Appeasing Jakarta: Australia's Complicity in the East Timor Tragedy and A Time for War: Australia as a Military Power. He is also a regular contributor to The Monthly, an Australian national magazine of politics, society and the arts.

In September 2006, Birmingham wrote a piece in The Australian lambasting Germaine Greer for an article she had written in The Guardian about Steve Irwin shortly after his death. He described Greer's comments as "a poisonous discharge of bile". Portions of Birmingham's article were later quoted in the Parliament of New South Wales.

In 2015, Birmingham parted ways with the traditional tradebook publishing business by becoming his own publisher after his Australian publisher's decision to release his Dave Hooper series several months prior to the release of the same books in the much larger North American and European markets instead of the near simultaneous global release that was used for the release his previous works. The result of his Australian publisher's poor business decision resulted in dismal sales in those larger book markets caused by the demand being filled through pirated electronic editions due to lack of availability through normal channels such as Amazon and Barnes & Noble. Using the new publishing model, Birmingham has published three Stalin's Hammer novellas plus a new novel called A Girl In Time.

Axis of Time
In 2004 he published the alternative history Weapons of Choice, the first in the Axis of Time trilogy, a series of Tom Clancy-like techno-thrillers. Many writers from those genres appear as minor characters. It was published by Del Rey Books in the United States, and by Pan Macmillan in Australia.

The series tells of a multinational peacekeeping force from the early 21st century being taken back in time to 1942, where its presence completely changes the course of the Second World War. In August 2005, the second book, Designated Targets was published in Australia. Publication in the United States followed in October 2005.

The third and final full-length novel in the trilogy, Final Impact, was released in Australia in early August 2006, and was released in the United States in January 2007. The ABC reported in 2006 that there were two new Birmoverse books in the works, one set shortly after the end of the war, and another in the alternative 1980s, said to feature a dashing young RAF pilot: Richard Branson. One of these books was originally set to be released in Australia in 2008, but Birmingham instead wrote Without Warning. The 2013 novella Stalin's Hammer: Rome continues the series.

Disappearance series
Without Warning, the first book in a new universe, was released in Australia in September 2008.  The novel is a thought experiment, set on the eve of Operation Iraqi Freedom in March 2003. It deals with the disappearance of the bulk of the United States' population as the result of a large energy field that becomes known as "The Wave". Without Warning deals with the international consequences of the disappearance of the world's only super power on the eve of war. It was released in the United States on 3 February 2009. A second novel, titled After America, was released on 1 July 2010 in Australia and 17 August 2010 in the United States.
The third book in the series, Angels of Vengeance, was released on 1 November 2011 in Australia and was released in April 2012 in the United States.

The Cruel Stars trilogy
A space opera series. The first book, The Cruel Stars, was published in 2019. The second, The Shattered Skies, was published in 2022. The third book in the trilogy, The Forever Dead, is scheduled for a 2023 publication.

Literary significance and reception
Kirkus Reviews gave a very positive review for The Cruel Stars and called it "Frenetic action viewed in a black fun-house mirror" for its narrative that "canters along at a good clip, dashing off insane cannibals, exploding warships, detached heads, and cartwheeling body parts, with occasional transfusions of dark comic relief." The reviewer for FanFiAd was "kind of stuck for words at how much I enjoyed this one". The reviwer for Book Page wrote "A good space opera can be many things. It can be funny or deeply philosophical. It can be touching, and it can be gory. John Birmingham’s latest novel, The Cruel Stars, balances all of those things, making readers laugh out loud even as it pulls them through an intergalactic battle for the soul of humanity." The reviewer for At Boundary's Edge compared this work to Tom Clancy's Ryanverse.

A reviewer for Space.com wrote about The Shattered Skies calling the book "military sci-fi at its finest". Writing for FanFiAddict, its reviewer called The Cruel Stars series utterly fantastic and wrote "Birmingham really finds new ways to keep the plot fresh and explore different, strange scenarios despite the crew being on a ship in the void that is space." Another reviewer wrote that the book has "absorbing conflicts with high stakes and believable antagonists, complex characters with rich relationships and effective emotional depth, and Birmingham’s magnificent world building" while avoiding the flaws in the first book of the series.The Shattered Skies was nominated for a Dragon Award for the 2022 Best Military Science Fiction or Fantasy Novel. This is Birmingham's first major literary award nomination.

Works

Non-fictionHe Died with a Felafel in His Hand (1994), The Tasmanian Babes Fiasco (1998), Leviathan: The Un-authorised Biography of Sydney (1999), How to be a Man (co-authored with Dirk Flinthart) (2000), Appeasing Jakarta: Australia's complicity in the East Timor Tragedy (2001), Off One's Tits (collection of articles & essays) (2002), Dopeland: Taking the High Road through Australia's Marijuana Culture (2003), A Time for War: Australia as a Military Power (2005), How to be a Writer: who smashes deadlines, crushes editors and lives in a solid gold hovercraft (2016), Stranger Thingies: From Felafel to Now (2018), On Father (2019), 

Fiction

Axis of Time Series
Weapons of Choice (2004), 
Designated Targets (2005), 
Final Impact (2006), Stalin's Hammer: Rome (2012), novella, Stalin's Hammer: Cairo (2016), ebook only novellaStalin's Hammer: Paris (2016), ebook only novellaStalin's Hammer: The Complete Sequence (2017), all three novellas (Rome, Cairo and Paris) have been repackaged as a single volume
An untitled work, beginning this history's WWIII, has been announced on John Birmingham's blog.

The Disappearance Series
Without Warning (2008), 
 After America (2010), Angels of Vengeance (2011), 

The David Hooper Trilogy (also known as Dave Vs. The Monsters)
Emergence (2015), Resistance (2015), Ascendance (2015), The Protocol for Monsters (2016), ebook only novellaSoul Full of Guns (2016), ebook only novellaThe Demons of Butte Crack County (2017) (Anthology)

A Girl In Time SeriesA Girl In Time (2016), The Golden Minute - A Girl In Time Novel (2018), 

End of Days SeriesZero Day Code (2019), Audible AudiobookFail State (2019), Audible AudiobookAmerican Kill Switch (2021), Audible Audiobook

The Cruel Stars Series
 Novels:
 The Cruel Stars (2019), 
 The Shattered Skies (January 2022)  (US)  (AU)
 The Empty Heavens (June 2023) 

Short stories:
 Parade Rest (2022) – A free short story prequel written with Jason Lambright about Lucinda Hardy's experiences as a cadet at the Royal Armadalen Naval Academy.

Short storiesFortune and Glory (2015), short story that was published in The Change: Tales of Downfall and Rebirth, an anthology in S.M. Stirling's Emberverse series

See also
 The Final Countdown (film)
 Worldwar''

References

External links
 
 John Birmingham's Brisbane Times blog, Blunt Instrument
 John Birmingham's other Brisbane Times blog, The Geek
 
 John Birmingham's work at the Sydney Morning Herald
 ABC Queensland story on Birmingham
 ABC Radio National story on Leviathan
 Tracee Hutchison's response to Birmingham's Greer article in The Age
 Clive Hamilton's response in the Sydney Morning Herald
 Articulate story on the Axis of Time trilogy
 Talk at the Wheeler Centre on female action heroines

1964 births
Living people
Australian freelance journalists
Australian science fiction writers
Australian alternative history writers
English emigrants to Australia
People from Ipswich, Queensland
Writers from Queensland
Writers from Liverpool
20th-century Australian novelists
21st-century Australian novelists
English male novelists
20th-century Australian male writers
21st-century Australian male writers
Australian male novelists